O. Chandrasekhar Menon (10 July 1935 – 24 August 2021) was an Indian professional footballer who played as a defender. He represented India at the 1960 Summer Olympics (Rome), the 1962 Asian Games (Gold medal), 1964 AFC Asian Cup (Silver medal), Merdeka Tournament (Silver Medal - 1959 & 1964) and 1964 Summer Olympics (Tokyo Qualifiers).

Early life and club career

Early life
Born in Irinjalakuda (India), Chandrasekhar honed his football skills at Maharaja's College in Ernakulam (India).

Club career

 Caltex, Bombay: 1956–1966
State Bank of India: 1966–1973

National championship (Santosh trophy)

 Maharashtra: 1956–1966

International career

He was a member of the Indian team in the 1960 Rome Olympics, 
where India famously held France 1–1 in a game, courtesy of Chandrasekhar and his defensive partners. He was also part of Indian teams that won gold in the 1962 Asian Games, silver in the 1964 AFC Asian Cup, silver in the Merdeka Tournament (1959 and 1964). He played alongside some of the greatest names in Indian football like PK Banerjee, Chuni Goswami, Tulsidas Balaram,  Peter Thangaraj, Jarnail Singh, and Mariappa Kempaiah, under coaching of Syed Abdul Rahim. He also captained India in few tournaments.

Manager career
 Chandrashekar became general manager of FC Kochin in 1994–95.

Death
After suffering from age related illness since 2015, O. Chandrasekhar died in Kochi on 24 August 2021. He was 86 years old.

Honours

International
1962 Asian Games
   Gold Medal
1964 AFC Asian Cup
  Silver Medal
Merdeka cup (Malaysia) 
  Silver Medal (1959, 1964)

Domestic
 1963 Santosh Trophy
   Champion

Personal
 Selected in Kerala's all time dream team (football)
 Selected as Kerala's top 10 Sports Person of the Century

References

Bibliography

External links
 

1936 births
2021 deaths
People from Irinjalakuda
Footballers from Kerala
Indian footballers
Association football defenders
India international footballers
1964 AFC Asian Cup players
Footballers at the 1960 Summer Olympics
Olympic footballers of India
Medalists at the 1962 Asian Games
Footballers at the 1962 Asian Games
Asian Games gold medalists for India
Asian Games medalists in football
Mumbai Football League players